Markus Ragger (born 5 February 1988) is an Austrian chess grandmaster. He won the Austrian Chess Championship in 2008, 2009 and 2010 and has played the first board for Austria in the Chess Olympiads since 2008. In October 2016, he became the first Austrian to reach a FIDE  rating of 2700. His peak rating is 2703, which he reached in February 2017.

Chess career
In 2011, he tied for 1st–5th with Alexander Areshchenko, Yuriy Kuzubov, Parimarjan Negi and Ni Hua in the 9th Parsvnath Open Tournament. He took part in the Chess World Cup 2011, where he was eliminated in the first round by Evgeny Alekseev. In the Chess World Cup 2013 he reached the second round and lost to Nikita Vitiugov.

In 2015, Ragger won the Politiken Cup in Helsingør on tiebreak over Liviu-Dieter Nisipeanu, Jon Ludwig Hammer, Laurent Fressinet, Tiger Hillarp Persson, Samuel Shankland, Sébastien Mazé, Mihail Marin, Sune Berg Hansen and Vitaly Kunin, after all players finished on 8/10. In the same year, he led the Austrian team to victory at the Mitropa Cup in Mayrhofen.

References

External links
 
 
 
 

1988 births
Living people
Austrian chess players
Chess grandmasters
Chess Olympiad competitors
Sportspeople from Klagenfurt